Millennium Soldier: Expendable, known in Japan as  , and in North America as just Expendable, is a run and gun video game that was released by Rage Software for Microsoft Windows in 1999. It was later ported to the Dreamcast and PlayStation consoles. A remake of the game, entitled Expendable: Rearmed, was released for Android in 2012. It is in the format of a modern arcade game. The player starts with 7 "credits" and can continue until running out of credits. A second player can join the game at any time by pressing start.

Gameplay
Expendable takes place sometime in the post-apocalyptic future, where most of the galaxy was conquered by a hostile alien race. To combat the aliens, scientists had developed a "Millennium Soldier" project by cloning two super-soldiers. Like most top-down run and gun video games, Expendable has collectible upgrades and weapons, and features common aspects like bosses and levels, familiar with most games of this type.

Development
Expendable supports Environment-Mapped Bump Mapping, a DirectX 6 feature first supported by the Matrox Millennium G400.

Reception

The game received mixed or average reviews on all platforms according to the review aggregation website GameRankings. Edge praised the PC version's graphics, stating that "the textures are near works of art, aided by colour lighting, true shadows and ubiquitous explosions". An unnamed reviewer of Next Generation in its August 1999 issue called the same PC version "a smart little shooter, but one with limited appeal in the PC market. A forthcoming Dreamcast version may be a better fit". However, their premonition was proven wrong one month later in the magazine's September 1999 issue, when Jeff Lundrigan called the Japanese Dreamcast import "a shameful waste of technology", and warned the reader to "stay away. Stay far, far away". In Japan, Famitsu gave the latter a little bit better score of 26 out of 40.

References

External links

1999 video games
Dreamcast games
Imagineer games
Infogrames games
PlayStation (console) games
Windows games
Run and gun games
Cooperative video games
Video games developed in the United Kingdom
Rage Games games
Multiplayer and single-player video games